Matria is a 2023 Spanish social drama film directed by Álvaro Gago (in his feature debut) which stars María Vázquez. It is shot in Galician.

Plot 
Set in a Galician fishing village, the plot follows the plight of Ramona, a financially-insecure working woman struggling to stay afloat.

Cast

Production 
The story is freely based on the life of Francisca Iglesias, a woman who took care of Gago's grandfather, and who starred in Gago's short film of the same name. María Vázquez took over the protagonist role (Ramona) for the feature film, playing a younger version of the character. Iglesias plays a minor role in the film. The film was produced by Pontevedra's Matriuska Producciones, Madrid's Avalon PC, Valencia's Elastica Films, and Barcelona's Ringo Media. Fully shot in Galician, María Vázquez (raised in the province of Lugo) faced the challenge of adapting her Galician to the variety from the Rías Baixas.

Release 
The film made its world premiere on 17 February 2023 at the 73rd Berlin International Film Festival, screened in the festival's Panorama lineup. It is scheduled to be released theatrically in Spain on 24 March 2023.

Reception 
Jonathan Holland of ScreenDaily, warning that "anyone looking for a plucky, against-the odds storyline told through the eyes of a victim of injustice has come to the wrong place", highlighted one of the film's key virtues being that [the protagonist] "is fallible and self-destructive".

Marta Balaga of Cineuropa deemed the film to be  "a welcome take on social cinema", otherwise featuring a protagonist [Ramona] that "feels real and fun to follow, even though one can run out of breath".

Accolades 

|-
| rowspan = "1" align = "center" | 2023 || 26th Málaga Film Festival || Silver Biznaga for Best Actress || María Vázquez ||  || align = "center" |  
|}

See also 
 List of Spanish films of 2023

References 

Galician-language films
Films set in Galicia (Spain)
2023 drama films
Spanish drama films
Social realism in film
Avalon films
2023 directorial debut films
2020s Spanish films